Ali Zafar is a Pakistani pop and rock singer-songwriter. He has released three studio albums and has composed three soundtrack albums. He debuted as a singer with song "Channo" in 2003 and sang his first movie song, "Jugnuon Se Bhar De Aanchal" in the same year. He has also sang for Hindi cinema from 2010 to 2016. His discography also includes songs for Pakistani films and dramas. He also has released many singles, covers, poetries, and has sung for TV commercials and brands, notably Coke Studio, ISPR, and Pakistan Super League.

Albums

Studio albums

Soundtrack albums

Soundtracks

Films

Pakistani films

Hindi films

Others
 2011: "Dekha" (from Masty) in Wall Street: Money Never Sleeps

TV series

Singles

Patriotic songs

Coke Studio

Lux Style Awards

Sports

Poetries

Covers and tributes

Others

TV commercials

See also
Rahat Fateh Ali Khan discography
Atif Aslam discography
Sahir Ali Bagga discography
List of awards and nominations received by Ali Zafar

Extra notes

References

External links 

 

Pop music discographies
Rock music discographies
Discographies of Pakistani artists
Discography